László Lukács de Erzsébetváros (24 November 1850, Zalatna – 23 February 1932) was a Hungarian politician who served as Prime Minister of the Kingdom of Hungary from 1912 to 1913. His father was Dávid Lukács, who was descendants of Armenian immigrants and mine owner.

1850 births
1932 deaths
Burials at Kerepesi Cemetery
People from Zlatna
Liberal Party (Hungary) politicians
National Party of Work politicians
National Civic Party (Hungary) politicians
Prime Ministers of Hungary
Hungarian Interior Ministers
Foreign ministers of Hungary
Finance ministers of Hungary
Hungarian people of Armenian descent